Lilly is a 1958 Indian Malayalam-language film, directed by F. Nagoor and produced by Manneth David. The film stars Prem Nazir and Kumari Thankam. The film had musical score by Viswanathan–Ramamoorthy.

Cast
 Prem Nazir 
 B. S. Saroja
 Sathyan 
 Bahadoor 
 Kumari Thankam 
 S. P. Pillai 
 T. S. Muthaiah 
 Muthukulam Raghavan Pillai
 K. V. Shanthi
 Susheela

References

External links
 

1958 films
1950s Malayalam-language films
Films scored by Viswanathan–Ramamoorthy